Heuser Nunatak is a small nunatak that lies  south of Mount Phelan and marks the southern extremity of the Emlen Peaks in the Usarp Mountains of Victoria Land, Antarctica. The nunatak was first mapped by the United States Geological Survey from surveys and U.S. Navy air photos, 1959–64, and was named by the Advisory Committee on Antarctic Names for Charles M. Heuser, a former biological laboratory technician operating at McMurdo Station during 1966–67. This topographical feature lies situated on the Pennell Coast, a portion of Antarctica lying between Cape Williams and Cape Adare.

References

Nunataks of Victoria Land
Pennell Coast